"32" is a 2013 English language single by Danish electro-rock group Carpark North featuring Stine Bramsen from Alphabeat. This is Carpark North's second pre-release from their upcoming 2014 album Phoenix after having released an initial single "Army of Open Arms" from the same album.

Track listing
"32" (Carpark North feat. Stine Bramsen) - (4:10)

Charts

References

2013 singles
2013 songs
Copenhagen Records singles